The 6th constituency of the Pyrénées-Atlantiques (French: Sixième circonscription des Pyrénées-Atlantiques) is a French legislative constituency in the Pyrénées-Atlantiques département. Like the other 576 French constituencies, it elects one MP using the two-round system, with a run-off if no candidate receives over 50% of the vote in the first round.

Description

The 6th constituency of the Pyrénées-Atlantiques lies in the south-west of the department and borders both the Atlantic Ocean and Spain. It sits within the French Basque Country. It includes the coastal resort of Biarritz, the border town of Hendaye, and Saint-Jean-de-Luz, which is famed for its beaches.

Assembly members

Election results

2022

 
 
 
 
 
 
 
 
 
 
 
|-
| colspan="8" bgcolor="#E9E9E9"|
|-
 
 

 
 
 
 
 

* LREM dissident without the support of the Ensemble alliance.

2017

|- style="background-color:#E9E9E9;text-align:center;"
! colspan="2" rowspan="2" style="text-align:left;" | Candidate
! rowspan="2" colspan="2" style="text-align:left;" | Party
! colspan="2" | 1st round
! colspan="2" | 2nd round
|- style="background-color:#E9E9E9;text-align:center;"
! width="75" | Votes
! width="30" | %
! width="75" | Votes
! width="30" | %
|-
| style="background-color:" |
| style="text-align:left;" | Vincent Bru
| style="text-align:left;" | Democratic Movement
| MoDem
| 
| 38.94
| 
| 62.51
|-
| style="background-color:" |
| style="text-align:left;" | Maider Arosteguy
| style="text-align:left;" | The Republicans
| LR
| 
| 15.28
| 
| 37.49
|-
| style="background-color:" |
| style="text-align:left;" | Peio Etcheverry-Ainchart
| style="text-align:left;" | Regionalist
| REG
| 
| 12.00
| colspan="2" style="text-align:left;" |
|-
| style="background-color:" |
| style="text-align:left;" | Christine Labrousse
| style="text-align:left;" | La France Insoumise
| FI
| 
| 9.31
| colspan="2" style="text-align:left;" |
|-
| style="background-color:" |
| style="text-align:left;" | Sylviane Alaux
| style="text-align:left;" | Socialist Party
| PS
| 
| 7.46
| colspan="2" style="text-align:left;" |
|-
| style="background-color:" |
| style="text-align:left;" | Sylviane Lopez
| style="text-align:left;" | National Front
| FN
| 
| 6.41
| colspan="2" style="text-align:left;" |
|-
| style="background-color:" |
| style="text-align:left;" | Sophie Bussière
| style="text-align:left;" | Ecologist
| ECO
| 
| 3.54
| colspan="2" style="text-align:left;" |
|-
| style="background-color:" |
| style="text-align:left;" | Jean Tellechea
| style="text-align:left;" | Regionalist
| REG
| 
| 2.25
| colspan="2" style="text-align:left;" |
|-
| style="background-color:" |
| style="text-align:left;" | Stéphane Alvarez
| style="text-align:left;" | Union of Democrats and Independents
| UDI
| 
| 1.72
| colspan="2" style="text-align:left;" |
|-
| style="background-color:" |
| style="text-align:left;" | Dominique Mélé
| style="text-align:left;" | Communist Party
| PCF
| 
| 1.24
| colspan="2" style="text-align:left;" |
|-
| style="background-color:" |
| style="text-align:left;" | Thomas Burc
| style="text-align:left;" | Independent
| DIV
| 
| 0.74
| colspan="2" style="text-align:left;" |
|-
| style="background-color:" |
| style="text-align:left;" | Jacqueline Uhart
| style="text-align:left;" | Far Left
| EXG
| 
| 0.64
| colspan="2" style="text-align:left;" |
|-
| style="background-color:" |
| style="text-align:left;" | Gabriel Grosjean
| style="text-align:left;" | Miscellaneous Right
| DVD
| 
| 0.47
| colspan="2" style="text-align:left;" |
|-
| style="background-color:" |
| style="text-align:left;" | François Amigorena
| style="text-align:left;" | Independent
| DIV
| 
| 0.01
| colspan="2" style="text-align:left;" |
|-
| colspan="8" style="background-color:#E9E9E9;"|
|- style="font-weight:bold"
| colspan="4" style="text-align:left;" | Total
| 
| 100%
| 
| 100%
|-
| colspan="8" style="background-color:#E9E9E9;"|
|-
| colspan="4" style="text-align:left;" | Registered voters
| 
| style="background-color:#E9E9E9;"|
| 
| style="background-color:#E9E9E9;"|
|-
| colspan="4" style="text-align:left;" | Blank/Void ballots
| 
| 2.06%
| 
| 14.63%
|-
| colspan="4" style="text-align:left;" | Turnout
| 
| 52.99%
| 
| 43.12%
|-
| colspan="4" style="text-align:left;" | Abstentions
| 
| 47.01%
| 
| 56.88%
|-
| colspan="8" style="background-color:#E9E9E9;"|
|- style="font-weight:bold"
| colspan="6" style="text-align:left;" | Result
| colspan="2" style="background-color:" | MoDEM GAIN FROM PS
|}

2012

|- style="background-color:#E9E9E9;text-align:center;"
! colspan="2" rowspan="2" style="text-align:left;" | Candidate
! rowspan="2" colspan="2" style="text-align:left;" | Party
! colspan="2" | 1st round
! colspan="2" | 2nd round
|- style="background-color:#E9E9E9;text-align:center;"
! width="75" | Votes
! width="30" | %
! width="75" | Votes
! width="30" | %
|-
| style="background-color:" |
| style="text-align:left;" | Michèle Alliot-Marie
| style="text-align:left;" | Union for a Presidential Majority
| UMP
| 
| 35.37
| 
| 48.38
|-
| style="background-color:" |
| style="text-align:left;" | Sylviane Alaux
| style="text-align:left;" | Socialist Party
| PS
| 
| 31.55
| 
| 51.62
|-
| style="background-color:" |
| style="text-align:left;" | Peio Etcheverry-Ainchart
| style="text-align:left;" | Regionalist
| REG
| 
| 9.78
| colspan="2" style="text-align:left;" |
|-
| style="background-color:" |
| style="text-align:left;" | Frank Jalleau-Longueville
| style="text-align:left;" | National Front
| FN
| 
| 6.33
| colspan="2" style="text-align:left;" |
|-
| style="background-color:" |
| style="text-align:left;" | Marie Contraires
| style="text-align:left;" | Democratic Movement
| MoDem
| 
| 3.85
| colspan="2" style="text-align:left;" |
|-
| style="background-color:" |
| style="text-align:left;" | Yvette Debarbieux
| style="text-align:left;" | Left Front
| FG
| 
| 3.81
| colspan="2" style="text-align:left;" |
|-
| style="background-color:" |
| style="text-align:left;" | Philippe Etcheverry
| style="text-align:left;" | Europe Ecology - The Greens
| EELV
| 
| 3.25
| colspan="2" style="text-align:left;" |
|-
| style="background-color:" |
| style="text-align:left;" | Jean Tellechea
| style="text-align:left;" | Regionalist
| REG
| 
| 1.79
| colspan="2" style="text-align:left;" |
|-
| style="background-color:" |
| style="text-align:left;" | Michel Lamarque
| style="text-align:left;" | Other
| AUT
| 
| 1.78
| colspan="2" style="text-align:left;" |
|-
| style="background-color:" |
| style="text-align:left;" | Jean-François Zunzarren
| style="text-align:left;" | Miscellaneous Right
| DVD
| 
| 0.95
| colspan="2" style="text-align:left;" |
|-
| style="background-color:" |
| style="text-align:left;" | Christophe Lepretre
| style="text-align:left;" | Ecologist
| ECO
| 
| 0.65
| colspan="2" style="text-align:left;" |
|-
| style="background-color:" |
| style="text-align:left;" | Sylvie Laplace
| style="text-align:left;" | Far Left
| EXG
| 
| 0.54
| colspan="2" style="text-align:left;" |
|-
| style="background-color:" |
| style="text-align:left;" | Michèle Noulibos
| style="text-align:left;" | Far Left
| EXG
| 
| 0.31
| colspan="2" style="text-align:left;" |
|-
| style="background-color:" |
| style="text-align:left;" | Sophie Hautenauve
| style="text-align:left;" | Other
| AUT
| 
| 0.05
| colspan="2" style="text-align:left;" |
|-
| colspan="8" style="background-color:#E9E9E9;"|
|- style="font-weight:bold"
| colspan="4" style="text-align:left;" | Total
| 
| 100%
| 
| 100%
|-
| colspan="8" style="background-color:#E9E9E9;"|
|-
| colspan="4" style="text-align:left;" | Registered voters
| 
| style="background-color:#E9E9E9;"|
| 
| style="background-color:#E9E9E9;"|
|-
| colspan="4" style="text-align:left;" | Blank/Void ballots
| 
| 0.84%
| 
| 2.58%
|-
| colspan="4" style="text-align:left;" | Turnout
| 
| 59.00%
| 
| 59.02%
|-
| colspan="4" style="text-align:left;" | Abstentions
| 
| 41.00%
| 
| 40.98%
|-
| colspan="8" style="background-color:#E9E9E9;"|
|- style="font-weight:bold"
| colspan="6" style="text-align:left;" | Result
| colspan="2" style="background-color:" | PS GAIN FROM UMP
|}

2007

|- style="background-color:#E9E9E9;text-align:center;"
! colspan="2" rowspan="2" style="text-align:left;" | Candidate
! rowspan="2" colspan="2" style="text-align:left;" | Party
! colspan="2" | 1st round
! colspan="2" | 2nd round
|- style="background-color:#E9E9E9;text-align:center;"
! width="75" | Votes
! width="30" | %
! width="75" | Votes
! width="30" | %
|-
| style="background-color:" |
| style="text-align:left;" | Michèle Alliot-Marie
| style="text-align:left;" | Union for a Presidential Majority
| UMP
| 
| 48.88
| 
| 58.37
|-
| style="background-color:" |
| style="text-align:left;" | Sylviane Alaux
| style="text-align:left;" | Socialist Party
| PS
| 
| 20.61
| 
| 41.63
|-
| style="background-color:" |
| style="text-align:left;" | Roland Machenaud
| style="text-align:left;" | UDF-Democratic Movement
| UDF-MoDem
| 
| 9.56
| colspan="2" style="text-align:left;" |
|-
| style="background-color:" |
| style="text-align:left;" | Beñat Elizondo
| style="text-align:left;" | Regionalist
| REG
| 
| 9.09
| colspan="2" style="text-align:left;" |
|-
| style="background-color:" |
| style="text-align:left;" | Christine Labrousse
| style="text-align:left;" | Far Left
| EXG
| 
| 2.09
| colspan="2" style="text-align:left;" |
|-
| style="background-color:" |
| style="text-align:left;" | Henri Chevrat
| style="text-align:left;" | National Front
| FN
| 
| 2.08
| colspan="2" style="text-align:left;" |
|-
| style="background-color:" |
| style="text-align:left;" | Marie Felices
| style="text-align:left;" | The Greens
| LV
| 
| 2.04
| colspan="2" style="text-align:left;" |
|-
| style="background-color:" |
| style="text-align:left;" | Pierre Batby
| style="text-align:left;" | Communist Party
| PCF
| 
| 2.00
| colspan="2" style="text-align:left;" |
|-
| style="background-color:" |
| style="text-align:left;" | Michel Aguilera
| style="text-align:left;" | Ecologist
| ECO
| 
| 1.27
| colspan="2" style="text-align:left;" |
|-
| style="background-color:" |
| style="text-align:left;" | Pascale Pierret
| style="text-align:left;" | Hunting, Fishing, Nature and Traditions
| CPNT
| 
| 1.25
| colspan="2" style="text-align:left;" |
|-
| style="background-color:" |
| style="text-align:left;" | Jacqueline Desoutter
| style="text-align:left;" | Independent
| DIV
| 
| 0.62
| colspan="2" style="text-align:left;" |
|-
| style="background-color:" |
| style="text-align:left;" | Michèle Noulibos
| style="text-align:left;" | Far Left
| EXG
| 
| 0.50
| colspan="2" style="text-align:left;" |
|-
| colspan="8" style="background-color:#E9E9E9;"|
|- style="font-weight:bold"
| colspan="4" style="text-align:left;" | Total
| 
| 100%
| 
| 100%
|-
| colspan="8" style="background-color:#E9E9E9;"|
|-
| colspan="4" style="text-align:left;" | Registered voters
| 
| style="background-color:#E9E9E9;"|
| 
| style="background-color:#E9E9E9;"|
|-
| colspan="4" style="text-align:left;" | Blank/Void ballots
| 
| 1.30%
| 
| 3.87%
|-
| colspan="4" style="text-align:left;" | Turnout
| 
| 62.03%
| 
| 59.15%
|-
| colspan="4" style="text-align:left;" | Abstentions
| 
| 37.97%
| 
| 40.85%
|-
| colspan="8" style="background-color:#E9E9E9;"|
|- style="font-weight:bold"
| colspan="6" style="text-align:left;" | Result
| colspan="2" style="background-color:" | UMP HOLD
|}

2002

|- style="background-color:#E9E9E9;text-align:center;"
! colspan="2" rowspan="2" style="text-align:left;" | Candidate
! rowspan="2" colspan="2" style="text-align:left;" | Party
! colspan="2" | 1st round
! colspan="2" | 2nd round
|- style="background-color:#E9E9E9;text-align:center;"
! width="75" | Votes
! width="30" | %
! width="75" | Votes
! width="30" | %
|-
| style="background-color:" |
| style="text-align:left;" | Michèle Alliot-Marie
| style="text-align:left;" | Union for a Presidential Majority
| UMP
| 
| 49.00
| 
| 60.89
|-
| style="background-color:" |
| style="text-align:left;" | Sylviane Alaux
| style="text-align:left;" | Socialist Party
| PS
| 
| 22.85
| 
| 39.11
|-
| style="background-color:" |
| style="text-align:left;" | Helyett Ginoux
| style="text-align:left;" | National Front
| FN
| 
| 5.74
| colspan="2" style="text-align:left;" |
|-
| style="background-color:" |
| style="text-align:left;" | J. Pierre Dirassar
| style="text-align:left;" | Regionalist
| REG
| 
| 5.64
| colspan="2" style="text-align:left;" |
|-
| style="background-color:" |
| style="text-align:left;" | Serge Lonca
| style="text-align:left;" | The Greens
| LV
| 
| 4.20
| colspan="2" style="text-align:left;" |
|-
| style="background-color:" |
| style="text-align:left;" | A. Marie Boudon
| style="text-align:left;" | Communist Party
| PCF
| 
| 2.66
| colspan="2" style="text-align:left;" |
|-
| style="background-color:" |
| style="text-align:left;" | Pascale Pierret
| style="text-align:left;" | Hunting, Fishing, Nature and Traditions
| CPNT
| 
| 2.32
| colspan="2" style="text-align:left;" |
|-
| style="background-color:" |
| style="text-align:left;" | Inaki Ibarloza
| style="text-align:left;" | Regionalist
| REG
| 
| 1.85
| colspan="2" style="text-align:left;" |
|-
| style="background-color:" |
| style="text-align:left;" | Didier Tastet
| style="text-align:left;" | Far Right
| EXD
| 
| 1.63
| colspan="2" style="text-align:left;" |
|-
| style="background-color:" |
| style="text-align:left;" | Daniel Couret
| style="text-align:left;" | Revolutionary Communist League
| LCR
| 
| 1.32
| colspan="2" style="text-align:left;" |
|-
| style="background-color:" |
| style="text-align:left;" | Michele Noublibos
| style="text-align:left;" | Workers' Struggle
| LO
| 
| 0.84
| colspan="2" style="text-align:left;" |
|-
| style="background-color:" |
| style="text-align:left;" | J. Max Caule
| style="text-align:left;" | Movement for France
| MPF
| 
| 0.79
| colspan="2" style="text-align:left;" |
|-
| style="background-color:" |
| style="text-align:left;" | Cecile Bremont
| style="text-align:left;" | National Republican Movement
| MNR
| 
| 0.63
| colspan="2" style="text-align:left;" |
|-
| style="background-color:" |
| style="text-align:left;" | Sebastien Larriviere
| style="text-align:left;" | Independent
| DIV
| 
| 0.54
| colspan="2" style="text-align:left;" |
|-
| style="background-color:" |
| style="text-align:left;" | Francois Belin
| style="text-align:left;" | Regionalist
| REG
| 
| 0.00
| colspan="2" style="text-align:left;" |
|-
| colspan="8" style="background-color:#E9E9E9;"|
|- style="font-weight:bold"
| colspan="4" style="text-align:left;" | Total
| 
| 100%
| 
| 100%
|-
| colspan="8" style="background-color:#E9E9E9;"|
|-
| colspan="4" style="text-align:left;" | Registered voters
| 
| style="background-color:#E9E9E9;"|
| 
| style="background-color:#E9E9E9;"|
|-
| colspan="4" style="text-align:left;" | Blank/Void ballots
| 
| 2.77%
| 
| 5.14%
|-
| colspan="4" style="text-align:left;" | Turnout
| 
| 63.76%
| 
| 59.62%
|-
| colspan="4" style="text-align:left;" | Abstentions
| 
| 36.24%
| 
| 40.38%
|-
| colspan="8" style="background-color:#E9E9E9;"|
|- style="font-weight:bold"
| colspan="6" style="text-align:left;" | Result
| colspan="2" style="background-color:" | UMP GAIN FROM RPR
|}

References

6